Sparrow is a chatbot developed by the artificial intelligence research lab DeepMind, a subsidiary of Alphabet Inc. It is designed to answer users' questions correctly, while reducing the risk of unsafe and inappropriate answers. One motivation behind Sparrow is to address the problem of language models producing incorrect, biased or potentially harmful outputs. Sparrow is trained using human judgements, in order to be more “Helpful, Correct and Harmless” compared to baseline pre-trained language models. The development of Sparrow involved asking paid study participants’ to interact with Sparrow, and collecting their preferences to train a model of how useful an answer is.

To improve correctness and help avoid the problem of “hallucination” of incorrect facts, Sparrow has the ability to search the internet using Google Search in order to find and cite evidence for any factual claims it makes.

To make the model safer, its behaviour is constrained by a set of rules, for example “don't make threatening statements” and “don't make hateful or insulting comments”, as well as rules about possibly harmful advice, and not claiming to be a person. During development study participants were asked to converse with the system and try to trick it into breaking these rules. A ‘rule model’ was trained on judgements from these participants, which was used for further training.

Sparrow was introduced in a paper in September 2022 titled “Improving alignment of dialogue agents via targeted human judgements”; however it was not released publicly. DeepMind CEO Demis Hassabis said DeepMind is considering releasing Sparrow for a “private beta” some time in 2023.

Training 
Sparrow is a deep neural network based on the transformer machine learning model architecture. It is fine-tuned from DeepMind’s Chinchilla AI pre-trained large language model (LLM), which has 70 Billion parameters.

Sparrow is trained using reinforcement learning from human feedback (RLHF), although some supervised fine-tuning techniques are also used. The RLHF training uses two reward models which capture human judgements; a “preference model” which predicts what a human study participant would prefer, and a “rule model” which predicts whether the model has broken one of the rules.

Limitations 
Sparrow’s training data corpus is mainly in English, meaning it performs worse in other languages.

When adversarially probed by study participants it breaks the rules 8% of the time; however this is still 3 times lower than the baseline prompted pre-trained model (Chinchilla).

See also 
 AI safety
 Commonsense reasoning
 Ethics of artificial intelligence
 Natural language processing
 Prompt engineering

References

External links 
 White paper
 Blog post

Chatbots
Language modeling
Natural language processing
Large language models